Jordan Metcalfe (born 24 May 1986) is an English actor. He is best known for his role as Adil in the sitcom Genie in the House.

Metcalfe has appeared as Jake in The Queen's Nose in 2003. He has played the roles of Chris Travis in Heartbeat, Andy Murphy in Casualty, and Kieran Tyler in Tea with Betty, an Afternoon Play in 2006. He also played the voice of 'Mould' in Fungus the Bogeyman (2004), the character 'Chip' in My Parents Are Aliens in 2006, Young Garstin in These Foolish Things (2006), Lightfoot in the documentary The Iceman Murder (2005), John Chappel Jr. in the drama-documentary The Last Flight To Kuwait, Byron in Ultimate Force, Wayne in Jacqueline Wilson's Girls In Love and Brian in Misfits.
2019 saw Metcalfe join the cast of Father Brown on BBC1 afternoons.

Other notable appearances include Timon in Maddigan's Quest and Oliver in Neil Bartlett's acclaimed production of Oliver Twist at the Lyric Theatre, Hammersmith in 2004. He has also worked in theatre playing the roles of the Artful Dodger in Oliver Twist, Nibs in Peter Pan, Jack in The Dreaming, and Young Katurian in The Pillowman.

Filmography

Film

Television

Theatre

in 2014 Metcalfe toured in the production The Hypochondriac alongside Sir Tony Robinson and Imogen Stubbs

References

External links
 
 Newspaper article
 Daily Telegraph review of Oliver Twist
 JPA Management (Agent)

English male television actors
1986 births
Living people
Male actors from Kingston upon Hull
21st-century English male actors